Bruno Finesi (25 April 1909 – 7 July 1972) was an Italian professional football player.

He played one game in 1924/25 and one game in 1925/26 for S.S. Lazio, and one game in the 1929/30 Serie A season for A.S. Roma.

External links
Profile at Enciclopediadelcalcio.it

1909 births
Italian footballers
Serie A players
S.S. Lazio players
A.S. Roma players
Association football midfielders
1972 deaths